The Hayhurst Farm is a historic farmhouse near Wrightstown, Pennsylvania built by Quaker minister John Hayhurst in 1742.  Hayhurst was a member of the Wrightstown Friends Meeting. General John Sullivan stayed at the farm from December 20–25, 1776 before crossing the Delaware River and leading troops in the Battle of Trenton on the morning of December 26. The farm was listed on the National Register of Historic Places in 1974.

References

Houses on the National Register of Historic Places in Pennsylvania
National Register of Historic Places in Bucks County, Pennsylvania
Houses completed in 1742
Houses in Bucks County, Pennsylvania
1742 establishments in Pennsylvania